There are more than 1,500 properties and districts listed on the National Register of Historic Places in the U.S. State of Maryland. Each of the state's 23 counties and its one county-equivalent (the independent city of Baltimore) has at least 20 listings on the National Register.

Current listings by county
The following are approximate tallies of current listings in Maryland on the National Register of Historic Places. These counts are based on entries in the National Register Information Database as of April 24, 2008 and new weekly listings posted since then on the National Register of Historic Places web site. There are frequent additions to the listings and occasional delistings, and the counts here are not official. Also, the counts in this table exclude boundary increase and decrease listings which modify the area covered by an existing property or district and which carry a separate National Register reference number.

See also

List of National Historic Landmarks in Maryland
List of bridges on the National Register of Historic Places in Maryland

References

 
Maryland